Elliot Millar-Mills (born 8 July 1992) is an English rugby union player. His playing position is prop.

Millar-Mills first played for Stockport and Macclesfield in his early career. He represented Cheshire in the 2016 County Championship losing to Cornwall 35-13 in the finals held at Twickenham Stadium. He also represented England Counties during their tour in Canada. 

Millar-Mills joined Yorkshire Carnegie permanently following a successful trial period. He left Leeds to join Scotland capital Edinburgh in the Pro14 ahead of the 2017-18 season. He made his senior debut for Edinburgh against local rivals Glasgow Warriors in a 17-0 loss in the 1872 Cup in December 2017. 

On 18 April 2018, Millar-Mills left Edinburgh to join Ealing Trailfinders in the RFU Championship ahead of the 2018-19 season. He made his debut for Ealing Trailfinders in a 7-20 loss against London Irish in the first Championship match of the new season. On 27 January 2021, Millar-Mills makes his move up to the Premiership Rugby competition with Wasps from the 2021-22 season.

Wasps entered administration on 17 October 2022 and Millar-Mills was made redundant along with all other players and coaching staff.

References

External Links
Its Rugby Profile
ESPN Profile

1992 births
Living people
English rugby union players
Scottish rugby union players
Wasps RFC players
Leeds Tykes players
Edinburgh Rugby players
Ealing Trailfinders Rugby Club players
Bath Rugby players
Rugby union players from Stockport
Rugby union props